The United States was the first country to have Google Street View images and was the only country with images for over a year following introduction of the service on May 25, 2007. Early on, most locations had a limited number of views, usually constrained to the city limits and only including major streets, and they only showed the buildings up to a certain height. Few suburbs or other nearby cities were included.

After the first few sets of introductions, image collections from cities added were more detailed, often including every side street, especially in areas closer to the center of the city. More suburbs and other nearby cities were included.

The coverage of various cities has in many cases, subsequently been enlarged and improved, but not necessarily on the same date as new cities have been added. Improvements have included the additions of streets in neighborhoods where previously only main roads had been covered, expansions to more suburbs, and views to the sky where previously only views to a certain height were provided.

Initially when a group of cities were added, only those cities and their own suburbs would be a part of the image collection. However June 10, 2008 introductions also included cities in covered areas without camera icons and isolated from any other camera icons. Many more cities were added without icons on August 4, when the only U.S. city added with an icon was New Orleans.

On November 9, 2009, parts of Hawaii were added, and coverage of the United States was also further expanded, although some key areas had yet to be added. With the addition of Hawaii, all fifty states are now represented in Street View.

On July 2, 2013, high-definition images, at least 99% of which has been taken since early 2011, were added to major portions of all fifty states, including those that have had no HD images up to that point.

Timeline of introductions 

Note: Bold indicates locations available in newer 'high quality' (or high definition) view. Italic bold indicates locations partially available in high quality view. Normal text indicates locations only available in older low-resolution view.

Areas included

References 

United States
Maps of the United States
Geography of the United States